The University of Wisconsin–Superior (UW–Superior or UWS) is a public liberal arts university in Superior, Wisconsin. UW–Superior grants associate, bachelor's, master's and specialist's degrees.  The university enrolls 2,559 undergraduates and 364 graduate students.

History
Originally named Superior Normal School, the university was founded by Wisconsin legislators as a school to train teachers in 1893.  Superior Normal School's first class graduated in 1897.  In 1909, the institution became Wisconsin's first normal school to offer a full-scale training program for the new idea of kindergarten.  It also was the first to offer a four-year program for high school teachers beginning in 1923.  After authorization to grant bachelor's degrees in education in 1926, the school took on the new name of Superior State Teachers College.  Graduate degrees were authorized in 1947 and first offered in 1950. In 1951 the state board of regents changed the institution's name to Wisconsin State College–Superior to better reflect its expanding role.  Wisconsin's state colleges eventually were reclassified as universities, resulting in another name change in 1964 to Wisconsin State University–Superior.  In 1971 Superior became part of the University of Wisconsin System and acquired its present name. To respond to cuts in state funding, in 2018 UW-Superior suspended a number of academic programs, claiming the cuts were in order to encourage more students to graduate on time.

Mission
UW–Superior has been designated as the public liberal arts college in the University of Wisconsin System, and is a member of the Council of Public Liberal Arts Colleges.

Campus 

The university's main campus is at the corner of Belknap Street (U.S. Highway 2) and Catlin Avenue.  Its north section is the site of all academic buildings and most residence halls.  The south section, at the corner of North 28th Street and Catlin Avenue, contains Hawkes and Ross residence halls, Wessman Arena, and the University Services Center.

Academic buildings
Barstow Hall, named for regent Barney Barstow: science programs, Lake Superior Research Institute
Erlanson Hall, named for regent Clarence Erlanson: School of Business and Economics, Transportation and Logistics Research Center
Gates Physical Education Building, named for regent Clough Gates: classrooms and labs, Mortorelli Gymnasium
Holden Fine Arts Center, named for university benefactor Paul Holden: communicating arts, music, and visual arts programs, Wisconsin Public Radio studios, Manion Theatre, Webb Recital Hall
Jim Dan Hill Library, named for the university's fifth president (1931-1964): University Library, Markwood Center for Learning, Innovation, and Collaboration, Area Research Center
Marcovich Wellness Center, named for regent Toby Marcovich: athletics, health and human performance programs, recreation, Thering Field House
Old Main, the oldest building on campus: Chancellor's Office, Provost's Office, Financial Aid Office, Center for Continuing Education, Bursar's (cashier's) Office, Center for Academic Advising, University Relations, Human Resources, Multicultural Center, Office of International Programs, Small Business Development Center, Veteran & Non-Traditional Student Center, Thorpe Langley Auditorium
Swenson Hall, named for university benefactors James and Susan Swenson: social sciences, education, languages, mathematics and computer science, Technology Services, First Nations Center, Student Support Services, Erlenbach Lecture Hall
Wessman Arena, named for regent Siinto Wessman

Yellowjacket Union: Admissions Office, Jacket Book and Supply, Union Cafe, Union Desk Information and Services, Rothwell Opportunity Center and student organization offices.

Residence halls
Crownhart Hall, named for regent Charles Crownhart
Curran Hall, named for regent Robert Curran
McNeill Hall, named for first president Israel McNeill (1896-1907)
Ostrander Hall, named for regent Frank Ostrander
Ross Hall, named for regent Frank Ross (president, 1903) 
 Hawkes Hall, named for regent Elizabeth Hawkes

Satellite locations
The university manages two field research and education properties:

Lake Superior National Estuarine Research Reserve, on Barker's Island in the Superior harbor, accessed from U.S. Highways 2/53
Nelson Outdoor Laboratory, 76 acres, on the Lake Superior shoreline within the city of Superior, at the end of Moccasin Mike Road

Research centers

UW-Superior hosts four regional research centers and has two other research institute affiliations.

Area Research Center, in Jim Dan Hill Library, collects public, historical, and genealogical records for Douglas and Washburn counties, in partnership with the Wisconsin Historical Society
Lake Superior National Estuarine Research Reserve studies the estuarine environment of the St. Louis River and the south shore of Lake Superior, in partnership with University of Wisconsin-Madison Extension and NOAA
Lake Superior Research Institute conducts original and applied research within the Lake Superior basin and beyond in Wisconsin
Transportation and Logistics Research Center studies regional transportation issues

Affiliated research institutes:
Great Lakes Maritime Research Institute is a shipping research consortium of UW-Superior and the University of Minnesota-Duluth
Wisconsin Sea Grant Institute has its Lake Superior regional office at the Lake Superior National Estuarine Research Reserve

Athletics
UW–Superior's athletic teams, nicknamed the Yellowjackets, are affiliated with the NCAA's Division III class.  Most teams compete in the Upper Midwest Athletic Conference (UMAC) and competed prior to 2015–2016 in the Wisconsin Intercollegiate Athletic Conference (WIAC).  Men's and women's ice hockey teams continue to compete in the WIAC. The men's hockey team won the NAIA national championship in 1976 and the NCAA Division III national championship in 2002.

Media

Radio station
KUWS, the university's radio station, broadcasts with 83,000 watts at 91.3 FM.  KUWS is an affiliate of the Wisconsin Public Radio Ideas Network, and also originates its own jazz, alternative rock, and other music programming as well as UW-Superior sports broadcasts.  The KUWS studios also serve as the WPR Northern Bureau and provide programming to stations WHSA, WHWA, WSSU(FM), and WUWS.

Student newspaper
The Promethean is the student newspaper for the University of Wisconsin–Superior. It began as The Peptomist, in 1920. Students voted to change the name to Promethean in 1974.  The name was changed again at the start of the 2007–2008 academic year, to The Stinger.  In Fall 2009, it became primarily an online newspaper, publishing a print magazine compilation at the end of each term.  In 2013, the newspaper returned to print, publishing bi-weekly.  In 2015, the name returned to Promethean.

Accreditation
The University of Wisconsin–Superior has been accredited by the Higher Learning Commission since 1916 and was a member of the North Central Association of Colleges and Schools prior to its dissolution.

Notable alumni

 Morrie Arnovich, MLB All Star outfielder
Richard Bong (attended), World War II flying ace 
Frank Boyle, Wisconsin state legislator
Esther Bubley, photojournalist
Howard W. Cameron, Wisconsin state senator
Herbert Clow, NFL player
David DiFrancesco, co-founder of Pixar 
Bernard E. Gehrmann, Wisconsin state legislator
Sandra A. Gregory, U.S. Air Force general
Yadamini Gunawardena Member of Parliament,  Parliament of Sri Lanka
Mary Hubler, Wisconsin state legislator
Oluf (Ole) Haugsrud (attended), owner of the Duluth Eskimos and a founding owner of the Minnesota Vikings
Steven L. Johnson, President and CEO of Sinclair College, Dayton, Ohio
Joe Kelly, co-founder of Dads and Daughters
Ernest J. Korpela, educator and Wisconsin state legislator
Gordon MacQuarrie, outdoor writer
Thomas W. MacQuarrie, president of San Jose State College from 1927 to 1952
Dom Moselle, NFL player
Tom Murphy, NFL player
Thomas B. Murray, Wisconsin state legislator
Scott O'Brien, NFL assistant coach
Wally O'Neill, NFL player
Reino A. Perala (attended), Wisconsin state legislator 
Angus B. Rothwell, Superintendent of Public Instruction of Wisconsin
Fritz Scholder (attended), Native American artist
Arnold Schwarzenegger, 38th Governor of the state of California, bodybuilder and actor
Patricia Spafford Smith (attended), small business owner and Wisconsin state legislator 
Stephen J. Smith, small business owner and Wisconsin state legislator, son of Patricia
Doug Sutherland, former NFL player with the Minnesota Vikings

Notable faculty and staff
Scott O'Brien, NFL assistant coach
Barton Sutter, poet and essayist
Irl Tubbs, head coach of the Miami Hurricanes and the Iowa Hawkeyes football teams
Albert D. Whealdon, chemistry professor and Wisconsin State Representative

References

External links 

UW–Superior Athletics website

 
University of Wisconsin-Superior
Superior
Educational institutions established in 1893
University of Wisconsin-Superior
Education in Douglas County, Wisconsin
Buildings and structures in Douglas County, Wisconsin
Tourist attractions in Douglas County, Wisconsin
1893 establishments in Wisconsin
Superior, Wisconsin
Public liberal arts colleges in the United States